The Voorburg Shield Cropper is a breed of fancy pigeon developed over many years of selective breeding. Voorburg Shield Croppers, along with other varieties of domesticated pigeons, are all descendants of the rock dove (Columba livia). This breed was developed by C.S.T. Van Gink at Voorburg in the Netherlands in 1935.

See also
List of pigeon breeds

References

 The Voorburg Shield Cropper: NPA Standard

Pigeon breeds
Pigeon breeds originating in the Netherlands